Belmont Avenue (also known as Franklin Park – Belmont Avenue) is a station on Metra's North Central Service in Franklin Park, Illinois. In Metra's zone-based fare system, Belmont Avenue is in zone C. As of 2018, Belmont Avenue is the 224th busiest of Metra's 236 non-downtown stations, with an average of 24 weekday boardings. Belmont Avenue was opened on January 30, 2006, along with three other new stations on the North Central Service.

As of December 12, 2022, Belmont Avenue is served by 12 trains (six in each direction) on weekdays.

Bus connections
Pace
 319 Grand Avenue

References

External links 

Railroad History of Franklin Park

Metra stations in Illinois
Railway stations in the United States opened in 2006
Franklin Park, Illinois
Railway stations in DuPage  County, Illinois
Former Soo Line stations